Dennis Olsen (born 14 April 1996) is a Norwegian racing driver currently competing in the Deutsche Tourenwagen Masters with SSR Performance. He is a former Porsche Junior Driver and former member of the Red Bull Racing Simulator Development Program.

Career

Karting
Born in Våler, Norway, Olsen began Karting in his native Norway aged six. After winning numerous junior titles, he stepped up to the KF3 class in 2009, winning the Norwegian title. He retained his title in 2010, a year which also saw him finish second in the Junior Monaco Kart Cup and third in the German Junior Karting Championship. In 2011, Olsen won his third consecutive Norwegian KF3 title, the German KF3 championship and the WSK Cup Final KF2 titles. For his final year of karting in 2012, he successfully defended his WSK Cup Final KF2 title and also won the prestigious German KF1 karting championship.

Toyota Racing Series
Olsen began his single-seater career in early 2013, racing in the New Zealand-based Toyota Racing Series, becoming the first Norwegian driver to enter the series. He finished the championship in thirteenth place, scoring a best race result of fifth in the final round of the series at Manfeild.

Formula Renault 2.0
Olsen's main racing program for 2013 was in the Formula Renault 2.0 NEC championship, racing for German team Josef Kaufmann Racing. He finished third in the standings, behind the British Fortec Motorsports pairing of Jack Aitken and Matt Parry after taking three podium finishes. He also recorded a Pole position for the final race of the season at Zandvoort, but the race was cancelled due to heavy rain. He also contested a one-off round of the Formula Renault 2.0 Alps season at Spa-Francorchamps with the AV Formula team.

For 2014, Olsen graduated to the Eurocup Formula Renault 2.0 championship with Prema Powerteam. He finished second in the standings, behind champion Nyck de Vries, after taking three podium places including race wins at Spa-Francorchamps and the Nürburgring. At the final round of the season in Jerez, he finished second in the first race, a result that initially earned him the runner-up spot in the championship, but was later disqualified for a technical infringement. He did, however, secure second in the championship the following day after finishing seventh in the final race of the season.

He also contested a partial campaign in the Formula Renault 2.0 Alps championship with Prema, taking six top ten finishes in the six races he took part in.

Olsen remained in Eurocup Formula Renault 2.0 for a second season in 2015, switching to Manor MP Motorsport.

Sports car racing
In 2023, Olsen returned to the Deutsche Tourenwagen Masters for a second consecutive season. After completing the 2022 season with SSR Performance, Olsen moved to Manthey EMA for 2023. In addition, Olsen competed in the 2023 GT World Challenge Europe Endurance Cup with Rutronik Racing, sharing a Pro class entry with Laurin Heinrich and DTM teammate Thomas Preining.

Racing record

Career summary

† As Olsen was a guest driver, he was ineligible for championship points. 
* Season still in progress.

Complete Porsche Supercup results
(key) (Races in bold indicate pole position) (Races in italics indicate fastest lap)

Complete European Le Mans Series results

‡ Half points awarded as less than 75% of race distance was completed.

Complete 24 Hours of Le Mans results

Complete IMSA SportsCar Championship results
(key) (Races in bold indicate pole position; races in italics indicate fastest lap)

* Season still in progress.

Complete FIA World Endurance Championship results
(key) (Races in bold indicate pole position) (Races in italics indicate fastest lap)

Complete Deutsche Tourenwagen Masters results
(key) (Races in bold indicate pole position; races in italics indicate fastest lap)

References

External links

 

1996 births
Living people
Norwegian racing drivers
People from Våler, Østfold
Toyota Racing Series drivers
Formula Renault 2.0 NEC drivers
Formula Renault 2.0 Alps drivers
Formula Renault Eurocup drivers
Formula Masters China drivers
24 Hours of Daytona drivers
24 Hours of Le Mans drivers
European Le Mans Series drivers
Porsche Supercup drivers
24H Series drivers
FIA World Endurance Championship drivers
Blancpain Endurance Series drivers
WeatherTech SportsCar Championship drivers
ADAC GT Masters drivers
Manor Motorsport drivers
Prema Powerteam drivers
GT World Challenge America drivers
Sportspeople from Viken (county)
Deutsche Tourenwagen Masters drivers
Porsche Motorsports drivers
Josef Kaufmann Racing drivers
M2 Competition drivers
MP Motorsport drivers
Walter Lechner Racing drivers
Rowe Racing drivers
KCMG drivers
AV Formula drivers
T-Sport drivers
Nürburgring 24 Hours drivers
Porsche Carrera Cup Germany drivers